The Morteratsch Glacier (Romansh: Vadret da Morteratsch) is the largest glacier by area in the Bernina Range of the Bündner Alps in Switzerland.

The Morteratsch Glacier is a typical valley glacier with a pronounced ice front. The accumulation zone lies between the peaks of Piz Morteratsch, Piz Bernina, Crast' Agüzza, Piz Argient, Piz Zupò and Bellavista.

The volume of the ice is estimated to be about 1.2 km3. The Morteratsch Glacier drains into the Ova da Morteratsch, which eventually flows into the Inn and hence via the Danube into the Black Sea.

In spring, depending on the snow conditions, a 10-km-long ski-run accessible to skilled skiers is marked on the glacier. The Morteratsch railway station used to be situated directly at the ice front of the glacier.

Yearly length change measurements have been recorded since 1878. Substantial retreat was ongoing through 2006 as well. During the last ten years, it lost another .

During the time that measurements have been taken, the glacier has advanced a few meters in only four years. Since the large glaciers react slowly to short-term climate changes, these advances cannot be accounted for by increased precipitation in the accumulation zone in the previous winter. On the high moraines to the left and right of the ice front, which are still nearly free of overgrowth, the enormous quantities of ice which were still being pushed down here at the end of the "Little Ice Age" in the middle of the 19th century can be seen.

In 2017, researchers began developing a snowmaking system to protect the glacier's ice, with a goal of covering square kilometer in 13 feet of snow. It was estimated that a decade of use might make a difference in length of 400-500 meters.

External links
 Short documentary of the Schweizer Fernsehen (Swiss Television) with fascinating shots of the ice caves within the Morteratsch Glacier ("Schweiz aktuell" of 23 December 2009)
 Short documentary of the Schweizer Fernsehen (Swiss Television) about climate related changes at Morteratsch Glacier ("Schweiz aktuell" of 15 September 2010)
 Picture gallery with fascinating shots of the ice caves within the Morteratsch Glacier

See also
List of glaciers in Switzerland
List of glaciers
Retreat of glaciers since 1850
Swiss Alps

References

Bernina Range
Engadin
Glaciers of Graubünden
Glaciers of the Alps